The Israel Export Institute (IEI) is an Israeli governmental agency which operates under the Ministry of Trade and Labor to facilitate trade opportunities, joint ventures, and strategic alliances between international businesses and Israeli companies.

Established in 1958, the institute is a non-profit organization which promotes Israel's industrial capabilities through business cooperation on all levels. With over 2,600 member companies, which together produces over ninety percent of Israel's industrial exports (excluding defense exports and diamonds), the IEI introduces companies in North America, Europe, the Middle East and the Far East to Israeli companies operating in various fields of interest, and provides assistance and information on the Israeli economy, development and market prospects.

The institute coordinates exhibitions and conferences in Israel and abroad and provides an on-line database of Israeli exporting companies. The institute is supervised by Avi Hefetz, who serves as the Director General. The chairman is Ami Arel, and the director of International Projects, Tenders and Automotive Development is Uri Pachter.

Departments

Water technologies
Electronics
Telecommunications
IT
Computer hardware and software
Healthcare
Pharmaceuticals
Dental equipment
Biotechnology
Automotive
Packaging
Electrical
Hardware
Subcontracting
Automotive (OEM and aftermarket)
Packaging
Space and aviation
Safety and security
Engineering
Infrastructure projects
Agricultural equipment and chemicals
Agrotechnology
Environmental technologies and products
Fashion and textiles
Jewelry, arts and crafts, giftware, and Judaica
Cosmetics and toiletries
Toys and games
Food and beverage
Film and TV
Office supplies
Optics
Books and publishing

See also
Economy of Israel

External links

References

Government of Israel
Foreign trade of Israel